Bellator 269: Fedor vs. Johnson (also known as Bellator Moscow) was a mixed martial arts event produced by Bellator MMA that took place on October 23, 2021 at VTB Arena in Moscow, Russia.

Background 
On the second last bout of his contract, Fedor Emelianenko was announced to be returning on October 23rd, 2021 against a TBA opponent at the VTB Arena in Moscow. The opponent was later revealed to be #2 ranked Timothy Johnson.

A heavyweight bout between Vitaly Minakov and Tyrell Fortune was scheduled as a comain for this event. However in August, it was announced that Fortune pulled out due to unknown reasons and was replaced by Said Sowma.

A welterweight bout between Grachik Bozinyan and Ross Houston was scheduled for this event, however Houston had to pull out of the bout due to medical issues. Bozinyan was rescheduled against Alexey Shurkevich, whose opponent Christian Eckerlin also pulled out.

A welterweight bout between Rustam Khabilov and Andrey Koreshkov was scheduled for this event. However the bout was scrapped after Khabilov came down with a sickness.

A lightweight bout between Vladimir Tokov and Aymard Guih was scheduled for this event, however Guih was not allowed to fight for medical reasons the day before the event and the bout was scratched.

At the weigh-ins, Aiden Lee and Gadzhi Rabadanov missed weight for his bout. Lee weighed in at 147.5 pounds, 1.5 pounds over the featherweight non-title fight limit and Rabadanov weighed in at 148.8 lb, 2.8 pounds over the featherweight limit. Aiden Lee vs. Alexander Osetrov bout proceeded at catchweight and Lee was fined a percentage of his purse which went to his opponent. Gadzhi Rabadanov vs. Alexander Belikh however was scrapped due to medical complication from Gadzhi's weight cut.

Results

See also 

 2021 in Bellator MMA
 List of Bellator MMA events
 List of current Bellator fighters
 Bellator MMA Rankings

References 

Bellator MMA events
2021 in mixed martial arts
2021 in Russian sport
Mixed martial arts in Russia
Sports competitions in Russia
Sports competitions in Moscow